Orculidae is a family of mostly minute, air-breathing, land snails; terrestrial pulmonate gastropod mollusks in the superfamily Pupilloidea.

Genera 
Genera within the family Orculidae include:<ref name="Hausdorf 1996">Hausdorf, B. (1996). "Die Orculidae Asiens (Gastropoda: Stylommatophora) (Mousson 1856) (Gastropoda, Pulmonata, Clausiliidae, Phaedusinae)"]. Archiv für Molluskenkunde 125 (1/2): 1-86.</ref>
 Alvariella Hausdorf 1996
 † Nordsieckula Harl & Harzhauser in Harzhauser et al., 2014 
 Orcula Held, 1838
 Orculella Steenberger, 1925
 Pilorcula Germain, 1912
 † Pupilorcula Steklov, 1966 
 Schileykula Gittenberger, 1983
 Sphyradium Charpentier, 1837

Synonyms
 Mesorculella Schileyko, 1976: synonym of Orculella Steenberg, 1925
 Pupula Mörch, 1852: synonym of Orcula Held, 1838
 Scyphus Cecconi, 1908: synonym of Sphyradium'' Charpentier, 1837

References

External links
 J., Haring E., Asami T., Sittenthaler M., Sattmann H. & Páll-Gergely B. (2017). Molecular systematics of the land snail family Orculidae reveal paraphyly and deep splits within the clade Orthurethra (Gastropoda: Pulmonata). Zoological Journal of the Linnean Society. 181(4): 778-794